Corymbia foelscheana, commonly known as the broad-leaved bloodwood, fan-leaved bloodwood or smooth-barked bloodwood, is a species of small tree that is endemic to northern Australia. It has thin, rough, tessellated bark on some or all of the trunk, smooth bark above, broadly egg-shaped to broadly lance- shaped adult leaves, flower buds usually in groups of seven, creamy white flowers and urn-shaped fruit.

Description
It has thin, rough, tessellated brown, grey or reddish bark that is shed in small polygonal flakes, on part or all of the trunk, smooth white to cream-coloured bark above. Flowering occurs from December to January or from January to May and the flowers are creamy white.

Taxonomy and naming
The broad-leaved bloodwood was first formally described in 1882 by Ferdinand von Mueller in The Chemist and Druggist with Australasian Supplement and given the name Eucalyptus foelscheana. The type specimens were collected "near Port Darwin" by Paul Foelsche. In 1995 Ken Hill and Lawrie Johnson changed the name to Corymbia foelscheana.

Distribution and habitat
This eucalypt grows on gentle slopes, on low rocky hills in open forest and in low open woodland usually in loamy and laterite soils. It occurs from the Kimberley region of Western Australia and east through the top end of the Northern Territory, including on Melville Island.

In a woodland setting associated species include Erythrophleum chlorostachys, Xanthostemon paradoxus, Eucalyptus setosa, Eucalyptus confertiflora and Eucalyptus latifolia in the overstorey and Grevillea decurrens, Gardenia megasperma and Calytrix exstipulata in the sparsely vegetated understorey.

See also
 List of Corymbia species

References

foelscheana
Myrtales of Australia
Flora of Western Australia
Flora of the Northern Territory
Taxa named by Ferdinand von Mueller
Plants described in 1882